"Geç Olmadan" (English: Before It's Too Late) is the fifth single by Turkish singer Murat Boz. It was released by Doğan Music Company as the annual commercial song for Cornetto in Turkey.

Track listing 
Digital download
 "Geç Olmadan" – 3:26

Charts

Release history

References 

2018 songs
Murat Boz songs
Turkish-language songs